All In Together (AIT) is a non-profit organization with the stated mission to equip voting-age American women with nonpartisan civic education. Their website describes the organization as a "non-partisan, collaboration-driven campaign to empower women with the tools they need to drive meaningful change..." The organization was founded in 2014 by Lauren Leader, Courtney Emerson, and Edda Collins Coleman. Leader currently serves as the organization's CEO.

Approach 
All In Together is a nonpartisan women’s organization that aims to advance the progress of women’s political, civic, and professional leadership in the United States. The organization has hosted workshops, seminars, industry forums, and Hill days. In 2017, All In Together launched a partnership with Gretchen Carlson titled the "Gretchen Carlson Leadership Initiative" meant to "bring civic leadership and advocacy training to thousands of underserved women across the country, with a special focus on empowering women who have experienced gender-based violence, discrimination, or harassment."

Founding sponsors, board, and advisors 
All In Together's founding sponsors include Citigroup, Daimler AG, and other companies and organizations. Their advisors include representatives from PwC, MWWPR, Accenture, Ocrolus, Condé Nast, Target, and Wallace Global Impact.

References 

Non-profit organizations based in New York City
Organizations established in 2014
2014 establishments in New York (state)
501(c)(3) organizations